Melnica is a village situated in Petrovac na Mlavi municipality in Serbia. It is the birthplace of revolutionary Paulj Matejić (1770–1816).

References

Populated places in Braničevo District